Gao Di (November 1927 – 26 October 2019), pen name Wen Di, was a Chinese politician, best known for his term as the chief editor of People's Daily and as Communist Party Secretary of Jilin province.

Biography
Gao was born in Linyi, Shandong Province. He graduated during the Republican era at Manchukuo University in Changchun, Jilin. He joined the Communist Party following victory in the Second Sino-Japanese War in April 1946. After the founding of the People's Republic, Gao worked in Jilin province. He worked for the Jilin City party committee, then at Songhuajiang Daily, then Yongji prefecture. He was purged during the Cultural Revolution and sent to perform rural labour. In 1972 he returned to work, taking on a leading role in the provincial Office for Rural Affairs and Forestry and various leading posts in Jilin City, eventually being promoted to party chief and mayor of Jilin City. In March 1983, he was admitted to the Jilin provincial party committee; in May 1985 he was named party chief of Jilin province.

In April 1988 he was transferred to the central party authorities to take on the office of Executive Vice President of the Central Party School. After the Tiananmen Square protests of 1989, the leadership of People's Daily was reshuffled in order to ensure "political loyalty" of the newspaper, with Gao Di taking on the post of head of the newspaper. However, he later fell out of favour due to not having sufficiently supported Deng Xiaoping's southern tour speeches, and was removed as chief officer.

In March 1993, he became a standing committee member of the 8th Chinese People's Political Consultative Conference; he retired and left politics in 1998.

He was a member of the 12th and 13th Central Committee of the Communist Party of China.

Gao died on 26 October 2019 in Changchun, aged 91.

References

1927 births
2019 deaths
Politicians from Linyi
People's Republic of China politicians from Shandong
Chinese Communist Party politicians from Shandong
Political office-holders in Jilin
People's Daily people
Members of the 12th Central Committee of the Chinese Communist Party
Members of the 13th Central Committee of the Chinese Communist Party